The 2015 Copa Libertadores first stage was played from February 3 to February 12, 2015. A total of 12 teams competed in the first stage to decide six of the 32 places in the second stage of the 2015 Copa Libertadores.

Draw
The draw of the tournament was held on December 2, 2014, 21:00 UTC−3, at the CONMEBOL Convention Centre in Luque, Paraguay.

For the first stage, the 12 teams were drawn into six ties containing a team from Pot 1 and a team from Pot 2, with the former hosting the second leg. The seeding of each team was determined by which associations reached the furthest stage in the previous Copa Libertadores.

Format
In the first stage, each tie was played on a home-and-away two-legged basis. If tied on aggregate, the away goals rule would be used. If still tied, the penalty shoot-out would be used to determine the winner (no extra time would be played). The six winners of the first stage advanced to the second stage to join the 26 automatic qualifiers.

Matches
The first legs were played on February 3–5, and the second legs were played on February 10–12, 2015.

|}

Match G1

Huracán won 4–0 on aggregate and advanced to the second stage (Group 3).

Match G2

Estudiantes won 4–1 on aggregate and advanced to the second stage (Group 7).

Match G3

Deportivo Táchira won 4–3 on aggregate and advanced to the second stage (Group 8).

Match G4

The Strongest won 3–1 on aggregate and advanced to the second stage (Group 4).

Match G5

Tied 2–2 on aggregate, Palestino won on away goals and advanced to the second stage (Group 5).

Match G6

Corinthians won 5–1 on aggregate and advanced to the second stage (Group 2).

References

External links
 
Copa Libertadores 2015, CONMEBOL.com 

1